Roslea Shamrocks is a Gaelic football club based in Rosslea, County Fermanagh, Northern Ireland.

History
The club was founded as Roslea First Fermanaghs in 1888. They were later known as Fág a Ballagh, then became Roslea Shamrocks in 1906, the name they have kept since (except for one season, 1944, when a merger with Aghdrumsee gave them the name Dresternan Shamrocks).

Roslea Shamrocks have won twelve Fermanagh Senior Football Championships, the most recent in 2014. They reached the final of the Ulster Senior Club Football Championship in 1982.

Notable players
 Peter McGinnity
 Joe Pat Prunty
 Seán Quigley

Honours
 Fermanagh Senior Football Championship (12): 1955, 1956, 1957, 1958, 1965, 1982, 1984, 1986, 2010, 2011, 2013, 2014
 Fermanagh Senior Football League (9): 1980, 1981, 1982, 1983, 1984, 1985, 2009, 2011, 2014
 Fermanagh Intermediate Football Championship (2): 1973, 1998
 Fermanagh Junior Football Championship (8): 1954, 1981, 1984, 1993, 1994, 1995, 1997, 2007

References

External links
 Roslea Shamrocks Official site

Gaelic games clubs in County Fermanagh
Gaelic football clubs in County Fermanagh